John Sewell (born 1940) is a Canadian political activist and writer; mayor of Toronto, 1978–1980.

John Sewell may also refer to:
John Sewell (athlete) (1882–1947), Scottish tug of war competitor
John Sewell (Miami) (1867–1938), third Mayor of Miami, Florida
John Sewell (footballer) (born 1936), English footballer who played during the 1970s
John Sewell (cricketer) (1844–1897), English cricketer
John Sewell (publisher) (1735–1802), English bookseller, printer, and publisher of European Magazine
Jackie Sewell (1927–2016), English footballer
Jack Sewell (rugby league) (1926–1955), rugby league footballer of the 1940s and 1950s

See also
John Sewel, Baron Sewel (born 1946), British academic and politician
Jack Sewell (Frederic John Sewell, 1913–2000), English cricketer of the 1930s